The Lagonda Taraf is a four-door full-sized luxury car manufactured by Lagonda, a marque owned by British automobile manufacturer Aston Martin since 1947. The Arabic word "taraf" means ultimate luxury in English. Initially, Aston Martin announced that 120 units would be built and that Taraf would be sold exclusively in Middle Eastern market. Then, Aston Martin revised its decision to increase the production number to 200 and extend the sale to Europe, South Africa, and United Kingdom.

History
The Lagonda marque was founded in 1906 by Wilbur Gunn. It won the 1935 Le Mans 24 Hour race with a Lagonda M45R driven by John Stuart Hindmarsh and Luis Fontés. The Lagonda Rapide V12, introduced in 1939, was the most expensive car in the United States at the time of its launch. The company soon filed for bankruptcy however due to failing customer interest in luxury and sports cars brought on by the Great Depression and the onset of the Second World War. The marque was bought by Alan Good, who outbid Rolls-Royce Limited. In 1947, Lagonda was bought by David Brown, who had also bought Aston Martin. The brand came back in 1976 after decades of being inactive with the introduction of the Aston Martin Lagonda luxury saloon, badged as an Aston Martin model. However the model was discontinued in early 1990, effectively killing off the brand name as well.

Aston Martin decided to revive the Lagonda brand in 2009 to expand into untapped market segments and celebrate Lagonda's centenary.

The resulting four-wheel-drive, four-seater concept saloon, unveiled in collaboration with Mercedes-Benz at the 2009 Geneva Motor Show, met with mixed reviews. The company then focused on development of the Taraf under Project Comet (the initial code name for the car).

Design
Project Comet was undertaken by Aston Martin's Q division which specialises in commissioning bespoke cars and  customising existing models to customer specifications. The final full-sized model was completed within 8 months of the first studio sketches in January 2014. Marek Reichman attributed to the swift execution to lessons learnt from the production of the One-77, which took two years to complete from design to conception.

The car was intended as a homage to the Lagonda model, produced between 1976 and 1990. A total of 645 of those cars were produced, each of which took 2,200 man-hours to build.

Specifications and performance

The engine was assembled at Ford's bespoke Niehl engine facility in Cologne, Germany. Power is transferred to the rear wheels via an 8-speed ZF automatic transmission. The chassis utilises the Aston Martin VH platform (VH410), shared with the Rapide. The body panels are made of carbon fibre-reinforced plastic (CFRP) and receive a seven-layer paint finish prior to final polishing. The goal of using this material was for weight reduction.

The interior included elements borrowed from other Aston Martin models, mainly the Rapide, and features console-mounted push-button transmission controls, an infotainment system, a 1,000-watt Bang & Olufsen BeoSound audio system and premium quality leather upholstery. The interior had various choices of trims, ranging from wood to carbon fibre. A long wheelbase gave increased legroom for rear seat passengers.

Production
Top Gear reported that the Taraf was undergoing hot weather testing in Oman in September 2014. The car was put through  of testing in four weeks in temperatures ranging between 30 and 50 °C in order to test the air-conditioning system, drivetrain and interior trim. The car was subsequently unveiled at the 2014 Geneva Motor Show.

The car commenced production in 2015 with the company stating that only 100 cars would be built solely for the Middle-East market. The Taraf was manufactured in Aston Martin's plant in Gaydon, Warwickshire. When Andy Palmer took over as the CEO, he had the car's potential markets expanded to include Europe, USA, Singapore and South Africa. He also had the total production goal increased to 200. As of 2015, only 40 cars were produced. The car was the most expensive four-door saloon in the world as of April 2016.

The Taraf made an appearance at the 2015 Goodwood Festival of Speed. Production ended by December 2016, with 120 cars being sold.

Lagonda Taraf "Final Edition" 
At the very end of production, 4 LHD Lagonda Tarafs were created under the "Final Edition" Specification. Priced at £550,000 with an additional deposit of £250,000, They can be distinguished from other Lagonda Tarafs with additional "standard features"; they are:

 Ultramarine Black paint with Volcano Red accents
 10-spoke Silver Diamond Turned Wheels
 Solid Sterling Silver Lagonda Wings Badge with red transparent enamel
 Q fender badges
 A Duotone interior in Aurora Blue & White Essence interior with "snowflake perforated seats"
 Caspian Blue carpeting with Dark Blue Lambswool floor mats
 Bespoke Red trans-enamel rotaries
 Bespoke Quliting Pattern on the seats, doors & hatshelves
 Final Edition sill Plaque
 3 Piece Lagonda Luggage (in Aurora Blue)

Reception
The car received positive reviews on release, with most reviewers citing the steep price as the biggest downside. Angus MacKenzie, in his review for Motor Trend, wrote the following: "This $1 million saloon, hand-built by Aston Martin, costs more than five times as much as a Mercedes-Maybach S600. Yet it matters little to the people who will buy the Taraf that the Maybach is technically the more accomplished ultra-luxury saloon." Autocar was also critical of the price, saying "Without context that price tag looks ridiculous. For the same money you could buy both a Rolls-Royce Phantom Coupé and a Bentley Mulsanne plus a fully-loaded Range Rover SV Autobiography on the side."

References

External links

 Lagonda Taraf on astonmartin.com

Taraf
Flagship vehicles
Cars introduced in 2014